Acinetobacter gandensis is a bacterium from the genus Acinetobacter which has been isolated from horse and cattle dung in Merelbeke in Belgium.

References

External links
Type strain of Acinetobacter gandensis at BacDive -  the Bacterial Diversity Metadatabase	

Moraxellaceae
Bacteria described in 2014